Razor is an unincorporated area in Lamar County, Texas.

History
A post office called Razor was established in 1904, and remained in operation until 1935. The origin of the name "Razor" is obscure, but is thought to have been applied by postmaster A. K. Haynes after a brand of tobacco that was sold in his shop.

References

Unincorporated communities in Lamar County, Texas
Unincorporated communities in Texas